The Hydro-Québec Building in Montreal, Quebec, Canada stands at  with 27 floors. Completed in 1962, it houses the headquarters for Hydro-Québec as well the Montreal offices of the Premier of Quebec. The building was designed by Gaston Gagnier.

The building is located on René-Lévesque Boulevard, named for former premier René Lévesque, who had nationalized Quebec's hydroelectric companies in 1963 while serving as Minister of Hydroelectric Resources and Public Works in the government of Jean Lesage. A bust of Lévesque was unveiled in front of the building on August 24, 2001.

References

External links
 Hydro-Québec

Skyscrapers in Montreal
Hydro-Québec
Office buildings completed in 1962
Modernist architecture in Canada
Government buildings in Montreal
Headquarters in Canada
Downtown Montreal
Government buildings completed in 1962
Skyscraper office buildings in Canada
1962 establishments in Quebec